Yunarys Ramírez Castillo (born 20 July 2003) is a Cuban footballer who plays as a goalkeeper for FC Villa Clara and the Cuba women's national team.

Club career
Ramírez has played for Villa Clara in Cuba.

International career
Ramírez capped for Cuba at senior level during the 2022 CONCACAF W Championship qualification.

References

External links

2003 births
Living people
People from Santa Clara, Cuba
Cuban women's footballers
Women's association football goalkeepers
FC Villa Clara players
Cuba women's international footballers
21st-century Cuban women